Firuz Kola-ye Sofla, also known as FIruz Kola-ye Pain, may refer to:
 Firuz Kola-ye Sofla, Amol
 Firuz Kola-ye Sofla, Nowshahr